Xinkaihe Subdistrict is a subdistrict located on northwestern Hebei District, Tianjin, China. It is situated to the southeast of Tianmu Town, southwest of Tiedong Road Subdistrict, north of Hongshunli and Santiaoshi Subdistricts, and east of Xigu and Dingzigu Subdistricts. It was home to 82,661 as of 2010.

The subdistrict was named after Xinkai River that is located on its southeast.

Administrative divisions 
At the end of 2021, Xinkaihe Subdistrict consisted of 17 residential communities. They are listed in the following table:

References 

Township-level divisions of Tianjin
Hebei District, Tianjin